Best of Both Worlds Concert is the live soundtrack from Hannah Montana & Miley Cyrus: Best of Both Worlds Concert, released on March 11, 2008 by Walt Disney Records. It includes live performances of songs from the soundtrack albums Hannah Montana (2006) and Hannah Montana 2: Meet Miley Cyrus (2007), which respectively accompany the first and second seasons of the television series Hannah Montana. All fourteen tracks are performed by its primary actress Miley Cyrus, although the first half are credited to her title character Hannah Montana. The album was recorded in Salt Lake City, Utah in October 2007, during Cyrus' headlining Best of Both Worlds Tour. The album debuted at number 3 on the Billboard 200.

Track listing

Charts

Weekly charts

Year-end charts

Sales and certifications

Release history

References

Hannah Montana albums
Miley Cyrus albums
2008 live albums
2008 soundtrack albums
Concert film soundtracks
Walt Disney Records live albums
Walt Disney Records soundtracks
Live albums by American artists
Live pop rock albums